The Alpaero Exel is a French single seat, single engine pusher pod-and-boom kit-built ultralight motor glider. About 10 had been produced by 2005.

Design and development
The Exel was designed to be sold complete or as a rapid-assembly kit. It is a single seat motor glider with a single engine in pusher configuration mounted high behind the cockpit. A T-tail is carried on a low set boom that extends the bottom line of the nose and cockpit pod.

The mid-mounted wings have carbon fibre spar caps and are glass fibre skinned.  For most of the span the wings have constant chord, but the final 30% is straight tapered on both edges, with winglets an option. The aspect ratio is 16.5.  Flaperons extend from the wing root just into the trapezoidal tip; flap deflections are +5°, 0° and -5°.  Upper surface air brakes are placed at mid chord, halfway along the parallel wing region.

The fuselage is formed from two glass fibre half-shells and plywood bulkheads. The pod ends at the trailing edge of the wing; forward, the single piece canopy produces an almost linear profile to the nose.  Fin and rudder, the latter fabric covered, are straight edged and slightly tapered, carrying a parallel edged, high aspect ratio tailplane with a single piece elevator.  The Exel has a single main landing wheel mounted within an integral fuselage fairing, assisted by a tail wheel mounted in the base of the rudder.  A pair of small outboard wheels protect the wingtips.

The standard Exel is powered by an 18 hp (13.4 kW) JPX D-320 flat twin, two-stroke engine, driving a two bladed pusher carbon fibre propeller which can be folded so both blades point aft for gliding flight. Optionally, a 21 kW (28 hp) Hirth F-33 single cylinder two stroke engine, a four-stroke Briggs & Stratton 21 kW (28 hp) or a Zenoah G-25  single cylinder two stroke powerplant may be fitted. A ballistic recovery parachute is another option.

Operational history
The prototype flew in September 1998 and production started the following year.  By the end of 2005, 9 Exels had been delivered.

Specifications (JPX powered)

References

External links
 Alpaero website

1990s French sport aircraft
Motor gliders
Single-engined pusher aircraft
Mid-wing aircraft
Aircraft first flown in 1998